Paul Andrew Williams (born 8 September 1963) is a Northern Irish retired footballer. He won one cap for the Northern Ireland national football team. He played as a forward.

He was born in Sheffield.

References

Northern Ireland's Footballing Greats

1963 births
Living people
Association footballers from Northern Ireland
Northern Ireland international footballers
Lisburn Distillery F.C. players
Nuneaton Borough F.C. players
Preston North End F.C. players
Carlisle United F.C. players
Newport County A.F.C. players
Sheffield United F.C. players
Hartlepool United F.C. players
Stockport County F.C. players
West Bromwich Albion F.C. players
Coventry City F.C. players
Rochdale A.F.C. players
Doncaster Rovers F.C. players
Premier League players
Association football forwards